Clinidium impressum is a species of ground beetle in the subfamily Rhysodinae. It was described by Ross T. Bell & J.R. Bell in 1985. It is known from French Guiana and Guyana. Male measures  and females measure  in length.

References

Clinidium
Beetles of South America
Fauna of French Guiana
Invertebrates of Guyana
Beetles described in 1985